Takasugi (written: 髙杉) is a Japanese surname meaning "tall cedar". Notable people with the surname include:

Takasugi Shinsaku (1839–1867), samurai
Mahiro Takasugi (born 1996), Japanese actor
Nao Takasugi (1922–2009), American politician
Robert Mitsuhiro Takasugi (1930–2009), United States federal judge of Japanese descent
Ryota Takasugi (born 1984), Japanese football player
, Japanese actress
Satomi Takasugi (born 1985), Japanese pop singer, race queen, and former gravure idol
Tricia Takasugi (born 1961), Japanese-American general assignment reporter

Japanese-language surnames